Gürhan is a Turkish given name for males. Notable people with the name include:

 Gürhan Gürsoy (born 1987), Bulgarian-Turkish footballer
 Gurhan Orhan (born 1954), Turkish jewelry designer and goldsmith
 Jamukha Gurkhan (born 1162), Mongol military and political leader and the chief rival to Temüjin

Turkish masculine given names